Marie Joseph is a small fishing community in the Canadian province of Nova Scotia, located in the Municipality of the District of Saint Mary's in Guysborough County. Marie Joseph Provincial Park is located in the community.

References
Marie Joseph on Destination Nova Scotia

Communities in Guysborough County, Nova Scotia
General Service Areas in Nova Scotia